Drumm is a surname. Notable people with the surname include:

Arthur E. Drumm (born 1929), American inventor and businessman
Don Drumm (sculptor), American sculptor
Don Drumm (singer), American singer
Emily Drumm (born 1974), New Zealand cricketer
James J. Drumm, Irish inventor
Kevin Drumm (born 1970), American musician
Leroy Drumm (1936–2010), American songwriter
Máire Drumm (1919–1976), Northern Ireland politician
Thomas E. Drumm (1909–1990), American government official
Thomas William Drumm (1871–1933), Irish-born American Roman Catholic bishop
Tommy Drumm (born 1955), Irish Gaelic footballer

Fictional characters:
Daniel Drumm, character in Marvel Comics